The 2020–21 Iowa Hawkeyes men's basketball team represented the University of Iowa during the 2020–21 NCAA Division I men's basketball season. The team was led by 11th-year head coach Fran McCaffery and played their home games at Carver–Hawkeye Arena as members of the Big Ten Conference. The Hawkeyes finished the season 22–9, 14–6 in Big Ten play to finish in third place. They defeated Wisconsin in the quarterfinal round of the Big Ten tournament before losing to Illinois in the semifinals. The Hawkeyes received an at-large bid to the NCAA tournament as the No. 2 seed in the West region. They defeated Grand Canyon in the First Round before losing to Oregon in the Second Round, ending their chances at their first Sweet Sixteen since 1999.

Senior center Luka Garza was named Big Ten Player of the Year and a consensus All-American for the second consecutive season. He was also named the consensus National Player of the Year and ended his career with a school-record 2,306 points (7th in Big Ten history). Senior guard Jordan Bohannon ended the season with school-records of 639 assists and 364 3-point field goals (2nd in Big Ten history).

Previous season
The Hawkeyes finished the 2019–20 season 20–11, 11–9 in Big Ten play to finish in four-way tie for fifth place. Their season ended when postseason tournaments including the Big Ten tournament and the NCAA tournament were canceled due to the coronavirus pandemic.

Forward Luka Garza was named Big Ten Player of the Year and was a consensus All-American.

Offseason

Returning players
Junior forward Luke Garza announced on April 10 that he would declare for the NBA draft, but retain his eligibility. On August 2, Garza withdrew his name from the draft and announced he would return to Iowa for his senior season.

Departures

2020 recruiting class

Roster

Schedule and results
On September 16, 2020, the NCAA announced that the start of the season would be pushed back to November 25 due to the ongoing COVID-19 pandemic.
|-
!colspan=9 style=|Regular season

|-
!colspan=9 style=|Big Ten tournament

|-
!colspan=9 style=|NCAA tournament

Source: Schedule

Rankings

^Coaches did not release a Week 1 poll.

References

Iowa
Iowa Hawkeyes men's basketball seasons
Hawk
Hawk
Iowa